The 2013–14 NBL season was the 11th season of the New Zealand Breakers in the NBL. Winning the 2012–13 season, they were the defending champions for the third season in a row.

References

2013–14 NBL season by team 
2013–14
Breakers
Breakers